Drosera graniticola is an erect perennial tuberous species in the carnivorous plant genus Drosera that is endemic to Western Australia. White flowers emerge from August to September.

D. graniticola was first described and named by N. G. Marchant in 1982.

See also
List of Drosera species

References

Carnivorous plants of Australia
Caryophyllales of Australia
Eudicots of Western Australia
Plants described in 1982
graniticola